Opinion polling for the 2006 Peruvian national election was carried out by pollsters authorized by the National Election Jury  both in the races for the Presidency and Congress.

Several candidates expressed skepticism about poll results and even accused the pollsters of deliberately lying. The Peruvian Association of Market Research (Asociación Peruana de Investigación de Mercados, APEIM) rejected such criticism and demanded formal apologies by those who accused the companies. APEIM also criticized the pollster IDICE, not belonging to the association, for critical flaws in its methodology. The company's results are nevertheless included in the section below.

Also, it is illegal to publish electoral opinion polls in Peru during the week prior to an election. Pollsters, however, released their results to the foreign press during the week before the First Round and these were widely available on the Internet. This drew criticism from electoral authorities, even though no law was technically broken.

Poll results

The following is a collection of polls relating to the 2006 Peruvian national election. Only polls conducted nationwide are included, though some have an urban bias. The results below only consider the eventual top five presidential candidates, top six congressional lists and, in the case of the hypothetical runoff, matchups between the top three presidential candidates. Little information is available on the other options.

The dates indicate when each survey was conducted. If the sources are not clear about the precise dates, either the month or the date of publication is indicated. In the latter case, the date is marked with a (p).

Unless stated otherwise, entries correspond to percentages over the total number of votes. When reported in terms of "valid" votes, the percentages are included in parentheses. Valid votes are those cast for exactly one presidential ticket or one congressional party list, thus excluding blank, multiple-party votes and undecided voters. The official results consider only valid votes.

Entries with "n/a" correspond to instances in which the relevant question was not asked, the option was not given, or the quantity was not deemed significant enough when the survey was published.

The abbreviations used for parties are as follows (coalition members are indented):

The abbreviations used for pollsters are:

Presidential Election

The deadline for the registration of presidential candidates was 9 January 2006. Polls conducted before this date are more speculative in nature, since the final set of options was not yet known before then.

First round

Hypothetical Runoff Election (polls before First Round)

Runoff Election (polls after First Round)

Congressional Election

The deadline for the registration of congressional candidates was 8 February 2006. Polls conducted before this date are more speculative. For many of these early polls, several coalitions were not even official, so some responses included parties which did not end up running by themselves. These are included in some entries below, along with the appropriate abbreviation as outlined above.

In particular, while the Sí Cumple party did not officially belong to Alliance for the Future, pollsters themselves often lumped it together with the other fujimorista movements before the AF coalition came into being, largely due to the perception that the same politicians belonged to these parties. This is not technically correct, but Sí Cumple results are still included below, though with an asterisk to make the difference clear (SC*).

Projected seat allocation in Congress, out of 120 seats, are included in square brackets when available.

See also

 2006 Peruvian national election

Elections in Peru
Peru